Mary Kay Inc. is an American privately owned multi-level marketing company. According to Direct Selling News, Mary Kay was the sixth largest network marketing company in the world in 2018, with a wholesale volume of US$3.25 billion. Mary Kay is based in Addison, Texas. The company was founded by Mary Kay Ash in 1963. Richard Rogers, Ash's son, is the chairman, and David Holl is president and was named CEO in 2006.

Business model 

Mary Kay sells cosmetics through a multi-level marketing model. Mary Kay distributors, called beauty consultants, can theoretically make income by directly selling to people in their community, and also receive a commission when they recruit others to begin selling under their distribution network. Mary Kay distributors must purchase a $100 starter kit to qualify. Mary Kay releases few details about the average income of its sellers. 

Starting in 1963 with 318 consultants and sales of $198,154, the company exceeded $500 million in sales through 220,000 consultants by 1991. In 1995, its sales had grown to $950 million, including $25 million in Russia. As of 2017, Mary Kay’s continuous multinational expansion had seen its sales grow to $3.7 billion with 2.5 million consultants, 39,000 directors and 600 national directors.

In March 2020, Mary Kay closed operation in Australia and New Zealand.

Manufacturing plants 
The company's primary manufacturing plant is in Dallas, Texas. A second plant was opened in Hangzhou, China, to manufacture and package products for that market. A third plant was opened in 1997, in La Chaux-de-Fonds, Switzerland for the European market. The Swiss plant closed in 2003.

Cars 
In 1968, Mary Kay Ash purchased the first pink Cadillac from a Dallas dealership, where it was repainted on site to match the "Mountain Laurel Blush" in a compact Ash carried. The Cadillac served as a mobile advertisement for the business. The following year, Ash rewarded the company's top five salespeople with similarly painted 1970 Coupe de Ville cars. GM has painted over 100,000 custom cars for Mary Kay. The specific shade has varied over the years from bubble-gum to soft pearlescent pink. GM had an exclusive agreement to sell cars of the specific shade only through Mary Kay. The cars are awarded to Independent Beauty Consultants/Directors as company-paid, two-year leases, and Consultants/Directors who choose to buy the cars at the end of the two year lease period are only allowed to resell them to authorized dealers. After the lease expires, the cars are repainted before being resold.

Mary Kay has different car incentive levels for its Consultants. Independent Beauty Consultants and Directors can earn the use of a silver Chevrolet Malibu or a cash compensation of $425 a month.  Independent Sales Directors can also earn a black Chevrolet Equinox, Chevrolet Traverse, Mini Cooper or $500 a month. Top performing Independent Sales Directors can choose between the pink Cadillac XT5 or XT6, or cash option of $900 a month. The specific qualifications for earning the car depend upon the country, and vehicle that is desired. If those qualifications are not met, then the Independent Beauty Consultant/Director has to pay for a portion of the lease of the car for that month. Meeting the qualifications entitles the Independent Beauty Consultant/Director to pay no monthly lease and 85% of the car insurance, or a pre-determined cash compensation award. In 2011, a solid black Ford Mustang was introduced as an incentive. In 2014, a black BMW was introduced in its place, although the pink Cadillac remains the top reward for those Independent Directors whose units purchase over $100,000 or more of MK products at wholesale cost in a year. Internationally, the cars available also vary depending on the regions and countries.

Earnings for salespeople 

There are two ways for Independent Beauty Consultants to earn money in Mary Kay: recruiting and retail sales.

Recruiting commission earnings 
"Recruiting commission earnings" reflects the commission and bonuses of 4, 9 or 13% that one earns from the wholesale purchases of MK products by their team or unit. These bonuses come straight from Mary Kay corporate and not from the Independent Beauty Consultants' team or units pockets. It does not include income from retail sales nor does it include income from the Mary Kay tools business.

Retail sales earnings

Mary Kay Independent Beauty Consultants earn a 50% gross profit on products they sell at full retail price. There is no tracking by the company of actual sales. The quoted figure of US$1,057.14 per year (2015) for the average consultant derives from dividing the annual wholesale sales by Mary Kay Inc., by the number of Mary Kay consultants. This figure does not account for product returns, eBay, auctions, sales at a discount, and purchases by "personal use consultants"—all of which would lower this figure.

Consultant turnover rate 

A 68.6% per annum turnover figure has been calculated based upon information supplied by Mary Kay (USA) to the Federal Trade Commission. An 85% per annum turnover figure has been calculated, based upon the data supplied by Mary Kay (Canada). That document excludes individuals who earn a commission and are in the company for less than one year. It also excludes individuals who are in the company for more than one year but do not earn a commission check.

Court cases

Woolf v. Mary Kay Cosmetics 
The 2004 court case Woolf v. Mary Kay Cosmetics argued that workplace rights could be applied to independent contractors who worked from their home. This decision was stayed and then reversed after an appeal. The Supreme Court denied certiorari on 31 May 2005. In this case, Woolf was terminated from her position as Independent Sales Director because her unit failed to make production for three consecutive months. Woolf contended that her firing was illegal, because she was suffering from cancer.

Liquidator court cases 
In May 2008, Mary Kay, Inc., sued Touch of Pink Cosmetics, a website that sells product from former Mary Kay consultants at heavily reduced prices. The company claims that Touch of Pink interferes with its business by offering to purchase inventory from discontinued Independent Beauty Consultants, and that Touch of Pink's use of the Mary Kay trademark in reference to Mary Kay products it sells is deceiving.  The jury found in favor of Mary Kay and awarded a judgement of $1.139 million.

On 20 July 2009, Mary Kay, Inc., sued Pink Face Cosmetics for trademark infringement.  The specific issue appears to be the use of the Mary Kay name, in selling Mary Kay products on eBay and other Internet venues for less than the wholesale cost of the products.

References

History of cosmetics
1963 establishments in Texas
Companies based in Addison, Texas
Retail companies established in 1963
Cosmetics companies of the United States
Multi-level marketing companies
Privately held companies based in Texas